Soilon is a trademark registered by Yamanaka Industry, Japan, in 2011, for a mesh made from polylactic acid (PLA) polymer resin by lactic fermentation of glucose, derived from starch (such as corn starch), by an enzyme and polymerization.  

By thermal polymerizing of lactic acid, an aliphatic polyester resin having melting point of 170°C and 57°C second order transition point respectively is achieved. Due to its plastic character, PLA can be melt-spun into fibers (filaments), which are woven for beverage filter media. It was designed for (and often used in) teabags.  It was chosen to replace the materials in teabags, since it can be biodegraded and broken down readily by microorganisms in the soil.  It is a safe and non-toxic alternative to the nylon bags usually employed.

While this material is better for the environment than nylon, it is not backyard-compostable.

References

Biodegradable materials
Packaging materials